Kritovo is a village in Pokrovsky District of Oryol Oblast, Russia.

References

Rural localities in Oryol Oblast